The Davey Elm, Ulmus × hollandica 'Daveyi', is an English hybrid cultivar of unknown specific origin, generally restricted to the valleys of Cornwall. Its apparent south-west England provenance, along with its foliage and habit, suggest that it may be a hybrid of Wych Elm and Cornish Elm.

Description
The wide-spreading, irregular branches support pendulous branchlets. The leaves are comparatively small, rarely exceeding 6 cm in length by 5 cm wide, with a glabrous upper surface.
Photographs often show this tree in its windswept coastal form; inland its shape resembles more closely its putative Wych Elm parent, though with a denser crown.

Pests and diseases
The tree is susceptible to Dutch elm disease.

Cultivation
A number of mature specimens are known to survive in south-west England, notably around Gulval, Newquay, the Roseland and St Kew in Cornwall. The tree is not known to have been introduced to North America or Australasia, and is not in commerce in the UK.

Notable trees
The UK TROBI Champion grows in the grounds of Holne Park House on the southern edge of Dartmoor. Discovered in 2017, it measured 30 m tall by 172 cm d.b.h. Another large tree grows in woodland behind Lancaster Avenue at Goodrington; when last measured in 2004 it was 22 m high by 100 cm d.b.h.

Synonymy
Ulmus major var. daveyi Henry

Etymology
The Davey Elm was named by Augustine Henry for Frederick Hamilton Davey (1868-1915), Cornish botanist and author of the Flora of Cornwall, first published in 1909 and reprinted in 1978.

Accessions

Europe
Brighton & Hove City Council, UK. NCCPG Elm Collection; two trees, City Cemetery, Brighton (planted 1988).
Grange Farm Arboretum, Sutton St James, Spalding, Lincolnshire, UK. Acc. no. 1098.  
Sir Harold Hillier Gardens, Romsey, UK. One specimen, Plant Centre Field. Acc. no. 2004.0088.
Wijdemeren City Council, Netherlands. Elm collection. 1 planted Slotlaan/Overmeerseweg, Nederhorst den Berg 2015.

References

External links
 Ulmus major var. daveyi Henry (Kew, 1938)
 Sheet labelled U. glabra x U. stricta, Wembury Valley, Devon, 1939 (Melville)
 Sheet labelled U. glabra x U. stricta, Wembury, Devon, 1939 (Melville)
 

Dutch elm cultivar
Flora of England
Environment of Cornwall
Ulmus articles with images
Ulmus